Bozo-ike is an earthfill dam located in Ehime Prefecture in Japan. The dam is used for irrigation. The catchment area of the dam is 1.4 km2. The dam impounds about 1  ha of land when full and can store 12 thousand cubic meters of water. The construction of the dam was completed in 1940.

References

Dams in Ehime Prefecture
1940 establishments in Japan